Free Spirit is an American fantasy sitcom that aired on ABC during the 1989–1990 television season. The series stars Corinne Bohrer as a witch who moves in with a recently divorced father to help care for his three children. Originally produced by ELP Communications, Free Spirit aired from September 22, 1989, to January 14, 1990.

Overview
Free Spirit follows the misadventures of a mischievous and vivacious witch named Winnie Goodwinn (Corinne Bohrer) who is summoned by 10-year-old Gene (Edan Gross) with a wish, and is subsequently hired as a live-in housekeeper by Gene's father Thomas J. Harper (Franc Luz), a recently divorced lawyer. Winnie looks after Thomas' three children, Gene, 13-year-old Jessie (Alyson Hannigan) and 16-year-old Robb (Paul Scherrer) who are still adjusting to their parents' divorce and their move from New York City to suburban Connecticut.

Thomas has no idea that Winnie is a witch, but his three children do. Although Winnie is good-hearted and never means any harm, her powers frequently get her and the family into trouble. Winnie often has to scramble to get out of various situations while keeping Thomas from learning her secret.

Cast

Main
 Corinne Bohrer as Winnie Goodwinn
 Franc Luz as Thomas J. Harper
 Edan Gross as Gene Harper
 Alyson Hannigan as Jessie Harper  
 Paul Scherrer as Robb Harper

Guest stars
 Maia Brewton
 Michael Constantine
 Dave Coulier
 Josie Davis
 Alex Désert
 Seth Green
 Florence Henderson
 Jenny Lewis
 Robert Reed
 Timothy Stack
 Michael Stoyanov

Production

Casting
In the unaired pilot, Christopher Rich portrayed the role of Thomas Harper and Shonda Whipple portrayed Jessie Harper. Since the show was originally conceived as a vehicle for Edan Gross and Corinne Bohrer, producers felt that Rich and Whipple were replaceable. Only the second version of the pilot aired with Franc Luz and Alyson Hannigan in their respective roles.

Broadcast history
Free Spirit premiered as a preview broadcast on September 22, 1989, at 9:30/8:30c, on the  first night in which ABC's Friday lineup used the now-popular TGIF format. On September 24, the series moved into its regular time slot of Sunday at 8/7c, airing between two other freshman series, Life Goes On and Homeroom.

Episodes

Reception and cancellation
Critical reviews of Free Spirit were generally negative. In a poll conducted by Electronic Media, television critics voted it the worst show on television. In addition to poor critical reception, the series struggled in the ratings. After ratings failed to improve, ABC canceled Free Spirit in January 1990. The last episode of the fourteen produced was never aired in the U.S..

Awards nominations

References

External links
 
 

1989 American television series debuts
1990 American television series endings
1980s American sitcoms
1990s American sitcoms
American Broadcasting Company original programming
American fantasy television series
English-language television shows
Fantasy comedy television series
Television about magic
Television series by Sony Pictures Television
Television shows set in Connecticut
Witchcraft in television